The European and African Zone was one of the three zones of regional Davis Cup competition in 2006.

In the European and African Zone there were four different groups in which teams compete against each other to advance to the next group.

Participating teams

Draw 

Morocco and Ukraine relegated to Group II in 2007.
Czech Republic, Italy, Serbia and Montenegro, and Belgium advance to World Group Play-off.

First Round Matches

Luxembourg vs. Portugal

Israel vs. Serbia and Montenegro

Second Round Matches

Morocco vs. Czech Republic

Italy vs. Luxembourg

Great Britain vs. Serbia and Montenegro

Ukraine vs. Belgium

First Round Play-offs Matches

Israel vs. Great Britain

Second Round Play-offs Matches

Morocco vs. Portugal

Great Britain vs. Ukraine

References

Main Draw

2006 Davis Cup Europe/Africa Zone
Davis Cup Europe/Africa Zone